The 1910 Purdue Boilermakers football team was an American football team that represented Purdue University during the 1910 college football season. In their first season under head coach Bill Horr, the Boilermakers compiled a 1–5 record, finished in last place in the Western Conference with an 0–4 record against conference opponents, and were outscored by their opponents by a total of 65 to 19. H. G. Fletcher was the team captain.

Schedule

References

Purdue
Purdue Boilermakers football seasons
Purdue Boilermakers football